Pozharsky District is an administrative and municipal district (raion), one of the twenty-two in Primorsky Krai, Russia. It is located in the northern and northwestern parts of the krai and borders with Khabarovsk Krai in the north, Terneysky District in the east and southeast, Krasnoarmeysky District in the south, Dalnerechensky District in the southwest, and with China in the west. Its administrative center is the urban locality (an urban-type settlement) of Luchegorsk. Population:  The population of Luchegorsk accounts for 67.6% of the district's total population.

History
The district was established on September 14, 1939 and is named after Ivan Pozharsky, a Hero of the Soviet Union who died during the Battle of Lake Khasan in 1938.

Population
Ethnic composition (2010):
 Russians – 91.6%
 Ukrainians – 3.5%
 Udege – 1.7%
 Nanai – 0.8%
 Others – 2.4%

Notable residents 

Viktor Barannikov (1940–1995, born in Fedosyevka), Soviet and Russian Interior Minister 1991–1993
Pavel Sulyandziga (born 1962 in Olon), Udege indigenous rights activist

References

Notes

Sources

Districts of Primorsky Krai
States and territories established in 1939
